"Walking on the Milky Way" is a song by English electronic band Orchestral Manoeuvres in the Dark (OMD). It was released as a single on 5 August 1996 and appeared on their Universal album a month later. The song reached number 17 on the UK Singles Chart, becoming the group's first UK top-20 hit in over five years, and their last UK top-40 single. The band were flanked by a full string orchestra for their Top of the Pops performance of the song broadcast on 16 August 1996.

Reception
Simon Williams of NME called the song "seethingly splendid" and "euphorically daft". In a retrospective article, AllMusic critic Dave Thompson praised Andy McCluskey's "rousing" vocal, and wrote, "With its sublime melody and a suitably anthemic chorus, this stellar single, released in August 1996, was a deserving Top 20 British hit." Jack Watkins of Record Collector described the track as a "powerful song" that "went largely unnoticed by radio stations".

Band response
McCluskey commented on the track in a November 2001 interview with The Guardian:

This frustration led McCluskey to abandon OMD, and form and write songs for Liverpool girl group Atomic Kitten (alongside erstwhile OMD member Stuart Kershaw).

Versions and B-sides
The same version of the song was used for the single and album release. A single edit was made for the promotional single, and appeared on the compilations The OMD Singles (1998) and Messages: Greatest Hits (2008). The B-side "Mathew Street", co-written with former Kraftwerk member Karl Bartos, references the location of Eric's Club (where OMD gave their first public performance) and The Cavern Club in Liverpool. The track is written in the style of a Sgt. Pepper's-period Beatles song. The CD single also features "The New Dark Age", a slower electronic ballad whose title references the band's 1981 song "The New Stone Age" from their Architecture & Morality album. It was written and performed by McCluskey alone.

Promotional video
A promo video was made for the song mostly featuring Andy McCluskey singing the song in various locations. The video makes use of slow motion and other special visual effects reflecting the tempo and grandiose style of the song. It was directed by Howard Greenhalgh.

Track listings
UK CD and cassette single
 "Walking on the Milky Way" 
 "Mathew Street" 
 "The New Dark Age" 

UK limited-edition CD single
 "Walking on the Milky Way" 
 "Joan of Arc" (live) 
 "Maid of Orleans" (live) 
 "Walking on Air" (live) 
 Live tracks were recorded live at Bonn Biskuithalle on 16 November 1993.

European CD single
 "Walking on the Milky Way"  – 4:38
 "Mathew Street"  – 3:33

Charts

References

External links

 Info at OMD's website

1996 singles
1996 songs
Music videos directed by Howard Greenhalgh
Orchestral Manoeuvres in the Dark songs
Songs written by Andy McCluskey
Virgin Records singles